Bank PHB Group, also known as Platinum Habib Bank Group, was a financial services organization in West Africa and East Africa. The Group's headquarters was located on Victoria Island in Lagos, Nigeria, with subsidiaries in Nigeria, the Gambia, Liberia, Sierra Leone and Uganda. Bank PHB Group was one of the largest financial services organizations in Africa, with an estimated asset base in excess of US$3.6 billion, as of December 2009.

Member companies
The member companies of Bank PHB Group included:

 Bank PHB - Lagos, Nigeria
 Bank PHB Gambia - Banjul, Gambia
 Bank PHB Liberia - Monrovia, Liberia
 Bank PHB Sierra Leone - Freetown, Sierra Leone
 Insurance PHB Limited - Lagos, Nigeria
 Mortgages PHB Limited - Lagos, Nigeria
 Orient Bank - Kampala, Uganda
 PHB Asset Management - Lagos, Nigeria
 PHB HealthCare Limited - Lagos, Nigeria
 Platinum Capital Limited - Lagos, Nigeria
 Spring Bank Plc. - Lagos, Nigeria

Failure and closure 
On August 5, 2011, the Central Bank of Nigeria revoked the operating licence of BankPHB, along with those of Afribank and Spring Bank, as they had not shown capacity to recapitalize before the September 30, 2011 recapitalization deadline.

Keystone Bank Limited was formed on August 5, 2011, by taking over all the assets (including subsidiaries) and liabilities of the now defunct BankPHB, whose commercial banking license had been revoked on the same day.

Following the revocation of the banking licence and takeover of BankPHB, the Nigeria Stock Exchange placed the Group's shares on technical suspension and finally delisted on September 5, 2011.

References

External links
 
 Bank PHB Acquires Spring Bank Plc.
 Bank PHB buys 80% of Orient Bank
Google Finance listing for Bank PHB Group
Bank PHB Withdraws Ghana Application
Bank of Namibia Withdraws Bank PHB License In Namibia

Defunct banks of Nigeria
Companies based in Lagos
Companies listed on the Nigerian Stock Exchange